Rafael Gómez (born 14 May 1960) is a Cuban wrestler. He competed in the men's freestyle 90 kg at the 1980 Summer Olympics.

References

1960 births
Living people
Cuban male sport wrestlers
Olympic wrestlers of Cuba
Wrestlers at the 1980 Summer Olympics
Place of birth missing (living people)